The Duquesne Country and Athletic Club ice hockey team was a member of the Western Pennsylvania Hockey League (WPHL) from 1896 to 1901. The team was based in Pittsburgh, Pennsylvania.

History
The Duquesne Country and Athletic Club (DC&AC) first played exhibition games of ice hockey in 1895. The Duquesne team then played in the first season of the WPHL at the Schenley Park Casino, with three other teams, the Pittsburgh Athletic Club, a club from Western University of Pennsylvania (the University of Pittsburgh today) and a team known as Pittsburgh, or the 'Casino' team. The league played twice a week, on Tuesday and Friday nights. The DC&AC and the WPHL continued play until December 16, when the Casino rink was destroyed by fire. The Duquesne team finished the shortened season of league play with a 2–3 record.

The league and the DC&AC resumed play in 1898, with its games moved to the new ice rink at the Duquesne Garden, with league members the Pittsburgh Athletic Club and Western University. Many of the team's players came from Canada, with the Pittsburgh-based club owners luring players to the area with the promise of high paying jobs and a living stipend.

By early 1901, the broader DC&AC organization, which had been active in multiple sports and fielded a professional football team of national repute, was in financial ruin and lost its clubhouse to foreclosure. The 1900–01 season was the hockey team's last.

References

See also
Duquesne Country and Athletic Club, an early American professional football team

Ice hockey teams in Pittsburgh
Defunct ice hockey teams in Pennsylvania
Duquesne
Duquesne
1895 establishments in Pennsylvania
1901 disestablishments in Pennsylvania
Ice hockey clubs established in 1895
Sports clubs disestablished in 1901